Millport may refer to:

Millport, Cumbrae, a town on the island of Cumbrae in North Ayrshire, Scotland
Millport, Alabama, a small town in Alabama, United States
Millport, New York, a village in New York, United States
Millport, Indiana, an unincorporated community in Washington County
Millport, Missouri, an unincorporated community
Millport, Columbiana County, Ohio, an unincorporated community
Millport, Pickaway County, Ohio, an unincorporated community
Millport (radio show), a BBC radio show about the Scottish town
Millport (album), a 2017 album by Greg Graffin